Dayron Miguel Sánchez Briceño (born 29 September 2000) is a Costa Rican footballer who plays as a midfielder for AD Guanacasteca.

Club career

Herediano
Sánchez is a product of C.S. Herediano. On 17 December 2017, 17-year old Sánchez got his official debut for Herediano against Pérez Zeledón in the Liga FPD, when he came in as a substitute for William Quirós in the halftime.

Sánchez did not play for the first team of Herediano again and therefore, he was loaned out to La U Universitarios in the summer 2019. However, he wasn't able to break through there neither and therefore, he left the club again at the end of 2019, without making his debut.

AD Guanacasteca
On 6 January 2020 AD Guanacasteca confirmed, that Sánchez had joined the club.

References

External links
 

Living people
2000 births
Costa Rican footballers
Association football midfielders
Liga FPD players
C.S. Herediano footballers